Alex Sandro Mendonça dos Santos (born 4 August 1986), commonly known as Cicinho, is a Brazilian footballer who plays as a right back.

Club career
Born in Jundiaí, Cicinho made his senior debuts with local Ituano in 2007. He then moved to neighbouring Oeste in January of the following year, but was subsequently loaned to Santo André in May, appearing in 20 matches and scoring twice during his first year, helping the Ramalhão return to Série A after a 25-year absence.

Cicinho made his Série A debut on 10 May 2009, starting in a 1–1 home draw against Botafogo. He appeared regularly in the campaign, which ended in relegation.

On 13 January 2011 Cicinho joined Palmeiras on loan until the end of the year. In July, Verdão bought one half of the player's rights, who signed a contract until 2015.

On 30 July 2012 Cicinho signed a four-year deal with La Liga's Sevilla FC, for a €2 million fee. He made his debut in the competition on 18 August, starting in a 2–1 home win against Getafe CF.

Cicinho scored his first goal for the Andalusians on 22 October, netting the winner of a 3–2 home success against RCD Mallorca. He finished his first season abroad with 27 appearances, with his side finishing seventh.

On 27 June 2013 Cicinho suffered a severe knee injury, which took him out of action for six months. On 28 January 2015, after failing to appear with the Rojiblancos after his injury, he was loaned to Segunda División's CD Numancia until June. He made 15 appearances for the team from Soria, heading an equaliser in a 2–1 loss at Girona FC on 1 March.

Cicinho returned to his homeland on 27 July 2015, signing a deal for Série B team Esporte Clube Bahia until the next May.

Honours
Palmeiras
Copa do Brasil: 2012
Sevilla
UEFA Europa League: 2013–14

References

External links

 
 
 

1986 births
Living people
People from Jundiaí
Brazilian footballers
Association football defenders
Campeonato Brasileiro Série A players
Campeonato Brasileiro Série B players
Ituano FC players
Oeste Futebol Clube players
Esporte Clube Santo André players
Sociedade Esportiva Palmeiras players
La Liga players
Sevilla FC players
CD Numancia players
Brazilian expatriate footballers
Expatriate footballers in Spain
Brazilian expatriate sportspeople in Spain
Footballers from São Paulo (state)